Greenside is a district and parish in Edinburgh between Calton Hill and the New Town.

Background

The deep natural hollow west of Calton Hill formed a natural amphitheatre and was historically used for viewing jousting matches and theatre, and is said to be the site of the first Edinburgh showing of the play A Satire of the Three Estates in 1554.

The first substantial structure in the area was the Rude Chapel of 1456 which was incorporated into a Carmelite Monastery built in 1526 at the north end of the hollow, roughly where Blenheim Place now stands (the north end of Greenside Row). In October 1589 the burgh council sent their representatives Alexander Oustean and Richard Doby to meet the builders of a new hospital for lepers at the Chapel of the Rude, to design or set out the bounds of the site and building, the hospital was completed in 1591. A water pump survived until the 1950s on the site of the monastery's Rude Well.

The area was generally undeveloped until 1800, but was then developed as high and dense tenements. The Leith Street section linked to Princes Street to the south-west and Baxters Place linked to Leith Walk. The low level street was originally called Nottingham Terrace later Nottingham Place and was feued in 1839.

In the early 20th century the area developed into an Italian ghetto, with roughly half the families being of Italian descent. This ended with the demolition of 90% of the tenements in the 1970s as part of the Abercrombie Plan for Edinburgh. This conceived a large roundabout (built) connecting over a bridge at Greenside, through a tunnel through Calton Hill to a motorway standard road on the line of St Mary Street (all unbuilt). The building of the roundabout necessitated loss of an entire city block on the south side of Picardy Place, including Arthur Conan Doyle's house. The change totally altered the nature of York Place, previously a quiet and affluent street and one of the best addresses in Edinburgh, and thereafter a dual carriageway.

After the Abercrombie Plan was abandoned the cleared Greenside site was initially proposed as a site for BBC Scotland. An office development began construction in the 1980s but was abandoned after construction of only the underground multi-storey car park. The incomplete structure stood for 15 years before recommencing as a smaller office scheme and the Omni Centre - an entertainment complex. The Omni Centre presents a largely glass curtain wall to the street and was completed in 2002.

Greenside Parish Church

Originally part of the parish of St Cuthberts (which covered Edinburgh's outlying areas) it was formally made a parish in 1836.

The church lies on the northern approach to Calton Hill between Blenheim Place and Royal Terrace. It was designed by James Gillespie Graham in 1830 and took nine years to complete, opening on 6 October 1839.

Ministers
 1839 to 1871 - William Glover DD (1801–1871)
 1871 to 1880 - Archibald Scott
 1880 to 1884 - John Milne
 1884 to 1887 - John Rudge Wilson
 1887 to 1898 - John Patrick
 1899 to ? - Jon Lamond (born 1855)
 1981 to 2011 - Andrew Anderson
 2011 onwards, no fixed minister

Bridge to Nowhere

From 1970 to 2019 a high level pedestrian bridge existed over Leith Street. Although downgraded over time, somewhat misunderstood, and eventually removed, it was not a bridge to nowhere.

The original concept linked to the Abercrombie Plan which foresaw a six lane road on the line of Leith Street and this was too dangerous for pedestrians to cross at road level. A high level pedestrian crossing was proposed. This linked at ground floor to the old St James Shopping Centre but due to dropping ground levels was high in relation to Leith Street. The original bridge discharged at high level on its east side, easing access to Calton Hill.

Around 1995 the bridge was revamped to join to an intended temporary tower on its east side, which had lift access to the underground car park and steps down to Leith Street. The link to Calton Hill was removed and the bridge itself redesigned with a serpentine rather than straight form.

Although the bridge was removed in the St James Centre redevelopment the tower at the east end still survives, and includes the steps which now indeed go to nowhere.

Kinetic Sculpture

In 1973 a "sculpture" was erected in the empty central area of the large roundabout. This bizarre structure cost £11000 (around £70,000 in 2021 terms) and was designed by Roger Dainton. It comprised a series of scaffold poles assembled on a triangular plan and rising to around 15m in height. The "kinetic" element related to an anenometer at the apex which linked to 96 fluorescent light tubes on the scaffolding to create a moving light show. However, apart from the first day this was never operated. This was partly due to running costs but more to do with the very rapid deterioration of the  tubes (which were not really intended for outdoor use). A brief and somewhat pointless "restoration" took place in 1983 which is the last time it functioned. It was removed in 1988 mainly due to the reconfiguration of the roundabout to a smaller size. The kinetic sculpture had no intrinsic value and was simply scrapped. This was to incorporate service lanes and parking areas on three sides but only the north side was completed as per plan. This held a statue of Sherlock Holmes (in tribute to Conan Doyle's house) but this was removed due to the Edinburgh Tram project. A watered down access (as per the 1988 plan) was provided on the west side next to St Mary's RC Cathedral, and here a more substantial sculpture by Eduardo Paolozzi was placed instead of car parking. These were gifted by Sir Tom Farmer in 1991. The south-east side was of the scheme was never built. This zone now forms the wide pavement in front of the Omni Centre.

Picardy Place

The tiny hamlet of Picardy is said to have begun in 1730 when the city magistrates brought in a group of refugee silk-weavers from Picardy in northern France. The city reacquired the land in 1800 for a formal extension of York Place to the west. The south side was demolished in 1969 to create the Picardy Place Roundabout. The surviving north side is designed by Robert Burn (1752–1815). The palace-fronted block has lost much of its original symmetry, especially with numerous ground floor alterations. The east side was "restored" around 1980 as a tax office, recreating the ground floor and basement but removing most of the chimneys. This section was converted into a Holiday Inn hotel around 2010. The property changed hands in 2017 for £18 million.

Buildings of Note
Greenside Parish Church (1830) by James Gillespie Graham
Lady Glenorchy's Free Church (1846) by John Henderson (architect) facade only remains - now in hotel use
Edinburgh Playhouse (1929) by John Fairweather
Omni Centre (2002) including giraffe sculpture by Helen Denerley

Notable residents
Arthur Conan Doyle
John Alexander Ford
Robert Stevenson (civil engineer)

References

Areas of Edinburgh